María José Pérez González (born 18 March 1988 in Aragua) is a female volleyball player from Venezuela who competed at the 2008 Summer Olympics in Beijing, China. Her team finished in 11th place.

Career
With her national team, she participated at the 2006 Central American and Caribbean Games, finishing in 5th place. A year later, she won the bronze medal at the 2007 South American Championship.

She signed with Llaneras de Toa Baja for the 2008 season of Puerto Rican league, Liga de Voleibol Superior Femenino. Later that year, started playing with the Finnish club Liiga Eura.

She started the 2014 playing the Indonesian Proliga with Manokwari Valeria Papua Barat. Pérez later won the 2014 Venezuelan League championship silver medal with Académicas de Caracas and was awarded best scorer.

She played again in the Indonesian League, this time with Jakarta Electric PLN, winning the Indonesian Proliga championship.

She was chosen best scorer and best spiker for the 2015 season of the Venezuelan league were her club, Académicas de Caracas finished second in the league championship.

Pérez signed in February 2017 with the Indonesian league club Jakarta Elektrik PLN, winning with this club the local championship.

In October 2017, Perez signed with F2 Logistics Cargo Movers to play in the Philippine Superliga. The team won the championship in the tournament and Pérez was awarded the Most Valuable Player.

Clubs
  Llaneras de Toa Baja (2008)
  Liiga Eura (2008–2010)
  AEL Limassol (2010-2011)
  Liiga Eura (2011–2012)
  Stella ES Calais (2012-2013)
  Manokwari Valeria Papua Barat (2014)
  Académicas de Caracas (2014)
  Jakarta Electric PLN (2015)
  Académicas de Caracas (2014)
  Jakarta Elektrik PLN (2017)
  F2 Logistics Cargo Movers (2017, 2018)
  Golden Tulip Volalto Caserta (2018-2019)
  F2 Logistics Cargo Movers (2019)
  Than Quảng Ninh VC (2022)

Awards

Individuals
 2014 Venezuelan League "Best Scorer"
 2015 Venezuelan League "Best Scorer"
 2015 Venezuelan League "Best Spiker"
 2017 Philippine SuperLiga Grand Prix "Most Valuable Player"

Clubs
 2014 Venezuelan League –  Runner-Up, with Académicas de Caracas
 2015 Indonesian Proliga –  Champion, with Jakarta Elektrik PLN
 2015 Venezuelan League –  Runner-Up, with Académicas de Caracas
 2017 Indonesian Proliga –  Champion, with Jakarta Elektrik PLN
 2017 Philippine SuperLiga Grand Prix –  Champion, with F2 Logistics Cargo Movers

National team

Senior team
 2005 Bolivarian Games -  Silver medal
 2007 South American Championship -  Bronze medal
 2013 Bolivarian Games -  Silver medal

References

External links
 FIVB profile
 Liiga Eura website

1988 births
Living people
Olympic volleyball players of Venezuela
Venezuelan women's volleyball players
Volleyball players at the 2008 Summer Olympics
People from Aragua
20th-century Venezuelan women
21st-century Venezuelan women